

I 

 
 
 
 
 
 
 
 
 
 
 
 
 
 
 
 98 Ianthe
 
 
 
 21062 Iasky
 
 
 
 
 
 
 
 
 2423 Ibarruri
 
 
 
 
 1566 Icarus
 
 
 
 
 
 
 
 
 
 
 
 286 Iclea
 243 Ida
 30705 Idaios
 
 
 
 
 2759 Idomeneus
 963 Iduberga
 176 Iduna
 
 
 
 
 
 
 
 
 
 
 
 
 
 
 
 
 
 
 
 1684 Iguassú
 
 
 
 
 
 
 
 
 
 
 
 
 
 
 
 
 12564 Ikeller
 
 
 
 
 
 
 
 
 
 
 51828 Ilanramon
 
 
 
 
 
 
 5130 Ilioneus
 
 
 37655 Illapa
 
 
 1160 Illyria
 
 385 Ilmatar
 1182 Ilona
 
 249 Ilse
 919 Ilsebill
 979 Ilsewa
 
 
 
 
 
 
 1520 Imatra
 
 5119 Imbrius
 
 926 Imhilde
 
 
 
 
 
 
 1200 Imperatrix
 1165 Imprinetta
 
 
 
 
 
 
 1325 Inanda
 
 1532 Inari
 
 
 
 
 
 
 
 
 1602 Indiana
 
 
 
 389 Industria
 
 
 391 Ingeborg
 
 
 
 
 
 
 
 
 
 
 
 1026 Ingrid
 
 
 561 Ingwelde
 1479 Inkeri
 848 Inna
 
 1658 Innes
 
 173 Ino
 
 
 
 
 
 
 
 
 10245 Inselsberg
 
 
 704 Interamnia
 
 
 
 
 
 
 85 Io
 
 
 
 5222 Ioffe
 509 Iolanda
 
 
 
 
 4791 Iphidamas
 112 Iphigenia
 
 11395 Iphinous
 16974 Iphthime
 
 
 
 
 
 
 3728 IRAS
 
 
 
 
 
 794 Irenaea
 14 Irene
 
 
 
 
 
 
 
 
 
 
 
 7 Iris
 
 
 
 
 
 177 Irma
 
 1178 Irmela
 591 Irmgard
 
 773 Irmintraud
 
 
 
 
 
 
 
 
 
 
 
 
 
 
 
 
 
 
 
 210 Isabella
 
 
 
 
 
 
 
 
 
 
 
 
 
 
 364 Isara
 939 Isberga
 1271 Isergina
 
 
 
 
 
 
 
 9971 Ishihara
 
 
 
 
 
 
 
 
 
 7088 Ishtar
 
 42 Isis
 
 1409 Isko
 
 
 190 Ismene
 
 
 1947 Iso-Heikkilä
 7187 Isobe
 
 
 
 211 Isolda
 
 
 1374 Isora
 
 
 
 
 
 
 183 Istria
 
 1735 ITA
 
 
 
 477 Italia
 
 
 
 
 
 
 918 Itha
 1151 Ithaka
 
 
 25143 Itokawa
 
 
 
 
 
 
 
 497 Iva
 
 
 
 
 
 
 
 
 
 
 
 
 
 
 
 
 
 
 
 1627 Ivar
 
 
 
 
 
 
 
 
 
 
 
 
 
 
 
 
 4951 Iwamoto
 
 
 
 
 
 
 
 
 
 
 28978 Ixion
 
 
 
 
 
 
 
 
 
 
 1546 Izsák

See also 
 List of minor planet discoverers
 List of observatory codes

References 
 

Lists of minor planets by name